Euryops walterorum is a species of flowering plant in the family Asteraceae. It is found only in Namibia.

References

walterorum
Flora of Namibia
Least concern plants
Taxonomy articles created by Polbot